Against the Wall is a 2010 science fiction short film directed by David Capurso and written and produced by Jeff Haber.  It stars Russ Russo, Sarah Ahlgren, and Tammy McNeill and is inspired by the Breakout style of video game play.  The short was accepted into 5 festivals, nominated for two Maverick Movie Awards, and given multiple online distribution deals, including appearances on iTunes and the G4TV website.

References

 http://www.g4tv.com/videos/54039/against-the-wall-a-g4-films-presentation/
 https://web.archive.org/web/20111202211525/http://www.filmthreat.com/reviews/27467/

External links

2010 short films
2010 films
2010 science fiction films
2010s English-language films